KICG (91.7 FM) is a radio station licensed to Perry, Iowa, United States.  The station airs a Classical music format as part of Iowa Public Radio's Classical network, and is currently owned by Iowa State University of Science and Technology. The transmitting tower is located approximately 25 miles northeast of Perry on Lamb Lane in Boone County, a little over a mile west of Boone, Iowa. On the FCC website, this station rebroadcasts KHKE (FM).

References

External links
KICG's website

ICG
Classical music radio stations in the United States
NPR member stations